IDS | International Design School is a higher education institution based in Jakarta, Indonesia, with its campus at Kemang, Jakarta.

IDS was founded by Andi S. Boediman in 2000, as Digital Studio College. In 2010, the school was renamed  IDS | International Design School.

Programs and departments
Course Title:
 Digital Design & New Media 
 Digital Animation & Games
 Digital Film & Media Production 
 Digital Advertising & PR
 Digital Marketing & Communication 
 Social Media & Digital Advertising

Academic program:
 Master's degree: 18-24 month graduate program
 College Program: 18-month professional program
 Undergraduate Program: starts 2013
 Creative & Media Course: 3-12 month professional courses
 Foundation Study: Creative Boot Camp, Art & Design Foundation
 Corporate Training: onsite/insite Company Workshop

Department:
 Design & New Media
 Animation & Games
 Film & Photography
 Creative Communication
 Social Media & Digital Advertising
 Creative Business & Entrepreneurship

References

External links
 International Design School

Colleges in Indonesia
Educational institutions established in 2000
Education in Jakarta
Entrepreneurship organizations
2000 establishments in Indonesia